Yevgenia Dudka (Ukrainian: Євгенія Василівна Дудка; 18 January 1991 – 7 March 2023) was a Ukrainian major in the civil protection service of the State Emergency Service of Ukraine, a participant in the Russian-Ukrainian war, who died during the Russian invasion of Ukraine.

Early life 
Yevgenia Dudka was born on 18 January 1991.

Adult life 
She worked as the head of the press service of the State Emergency Service of Ukraine in the Dnipropetrovsk region. On 10 April 2022, after the Russian shelling of Dnipro International Airport, Dudka and her husband went to the affected area. A 100m2 fire had taken hold of the airport, and she engaged in fire fighting operations. At 12:47pm, shrapnel from another Russian airstrike of the airfield caused injuries to her and five other rescuers. Dudka was the most badly injured of the six, which included her partner, Igor Getalo.

Dudka married Getalo on 27 May 2022, while she was undergoing medical treatment. 

After a period of receiving intensive care at Dnipro hospital, Dudka was transfered to Germany June 2022, where she remained for over six months. In Germany she was in a coma for four days, and received care for a ruptured liver, bilateral pneumonia and constant pain. Treatment included round-the-clock hemodialysis. 

She returned to Ukraine in February 2023, and received care in Kyiv.

Death 
Dudka died on 7 March 2023, due to medical complications. Her funeral took place on 10 March in the Church of the Nativity of the Most Holy Theotokos of the Dnipro diocese.

Awards
Dudka was awarded the Order for Courage (third class) on 25 April 2022 for her actions during the Russo-Ukrainian war.

References

1991 births
2023 deaths
Recipients of the Order For Courage, 3rd class
Ukrainian military personnel killed in the 2022 Russian invasion of Ukraine
People from Dnipropetrovsk Oblast